"Dixie on My Mind" is a song written and recorded by American country music artist Hank Williams Jr.  It was released in May 1981 as the second single from the album Rowdy.  The song was Williams Jr.'s fourth number one on the country chart.  The single went to number one for one week and spent nine weeks on the country chart.

Content
The song features Hank attempting to give big city life a fair shot (New York City in particular) but ends up feeling more dissatisfied than ever with city life, but is unable to return home ("Lord I'm stuck up here but I've got Dixie on my mind").

Chart performance

References

1981 singles
1981 songs
Hank Williams Jr. songs
Songs written by Hank Williams Jr.
Song recordings produced by Jimmy Bowen
Elektra Records singles
Curb Records singles